The Teteté were a small group of Western Tucanoan speakers, who once lived in the Ecuadorian Amazon or Oriente. Today, their territory would lie within Ecuador’s Cuyabeno Wildlife Reserve, a popular site for ecotourism. From 1877 through the 1920s, however, Ecuadorian and Colombian rubber collectors (caucheros) and their native press gangs worked this part of the upper Aguarico and Putumayo watersheds, shooting or kidnapping Tetete people whenever they showed themselves. Sometime before 1940, most of the remaining Tetete were killed in a raid by neighboring Siona people. “On a sandbar, the two groups faced each other in long lines and began to fight. Very soon, the Siona won; a few Tetete escaped, others died, and several were wounded…Later, a Siona man found them fishing on Lake Cuyabeno, and they wounded him slightly in the shoulder…After that, we never saw them again.”. Large numbers of the Teteté were ultimately driven to extinction by missionaries and petroleum companies after oil exploration began nearby in 1964. The Ecuadorian Government officials have stated that the extinction of the Tetete people was partly caused by the encroachment of Texaco onto their land. The loss of hunting grounds to deforestation caused by oil expansion and subsequent oil contamination contributed to their extinction.

When they were “rediscovered” by Catholic priests in 1966, only three elderly survivors remained. Their last contact with outsiders – an American Evangelical missionary and his Siona-Secoya translators – occurred in 1973.

References

Indigenous peoples in Ecuador
Indigenous peoples of the Amazon